The Politics of Northern Cyprus takes place in a framework of a semi-presidential representative democratic republic, whereby the president is head of state and the prime minister is the head of government, and of a multi-party system. Executive power is exercised by the government. Legislative power is vested in both the government and the Assembly of the Republic. The judiciary is independent of the executive and the legislature.

Since the Turkish invasion of 1974, the Republic of Cyprus has been divided: the northern third of the island was unilaterally declared to be the Turkish Republic of Northern Cyprus (TRNC) by its Turkish Cypriot population. The United Nations considers the declaration of independence of Northern Cyprus to be legally invalid and calls for the withdrawal of troops from Turkey that invaded the island in support of the Turkisk Cypriot minority. The government of Northern Cyprus has not been  diplomatically recognized except by the Government of Turkey since its unilateral declaration of independence in 1983.

In 1974, the Greek-backed Cypriot National Guard took over the government in a coup. Turkey sent troops in response, claiming it had authority under the 1960 Treaty of Guarantee, Turkish Cypriots set up their own institutions as the "Turkish Federated State of North Cyprus". In 1983, the Turkish Cypriots unilaterally declared independence as the Turkish Republic of Northern Cyprus (TRNC). In 1985, they adopted a constitution and held elections—an arrangement thus far recognized only by Turkey.

Political conditions 
From 1975 to 2005, the president was Rauf Denktaş. An ardent nationalist, he pursued a policy of trying to gain international recognition of Northern Cyprus. However, this stance proved to be a major stumbling block to reconciliation efforts. This stance, while initially supported by the Turkish Cypriot populace, began to work against him when the Republic of Cyprus joined the European Union.

Northern Cyprus held multi-party parliamentary elections in 1993, removing the long-ruling National Unity Party in favour of a coalition of the Democratic Party and Republican Turkish Party (CTP). However, in August 1996, a new coalition was formed between the two main rightist parties, the National Unity Party and the Democratic Party, which stayed in power for the next eight years. In 2003, the CTP and DP formed a new government, placing CTP leader Mehmet Ali Talat as the new Prime Minister.

In 2005, Rauf Denktaş retired from the presidency. Talat won the presidential election, becoming the second President of the republic. He resigned as Prime Minister, and replaced by CTP Deputy Leader Ferdi Sabit Soyer.

UN-sponsored negotiations to develop institutional arrangements acceptable to both communities began in 1968; several sets of negotiations and other initiatives followed. Turkish Cypriots focused on bi-zonality, security guarantees, and political equality between the two communities. The Greek Cypriots however emphasized the rights of unrestricted population movement, recovery of property, resettlement, and the return of territory to their control. Turkish Cypriots favour a federation of two nearly autonomous societies living side by side with limited contact, and allowing Turkish migrants to stay, while Greek Cypriots envision a more integrated structure, and requiring the Turkish migrants to leave the island.

UN Secretary-General Kofi Annan tried to present a compromise formula which would have enabled a federal state to be established on the island. While there were serious compromises made on both sides, neither the Greek and Turkish Cypriot leaderships were happy with the final plan. Nonetheless, it was decided to put the issue to the voters.

In 2004, the Annan Plan was supported in a referendum by two-thirds of the Turkish Cypriots voting. However, it was defeated by nearly three-quarters of the Greek Cypriots. Had the plan been accepted by both communities, the United Cyprus Republic would have resulted. However, the rejection by the Greek Cypriots meant that only they could benefit from all the privileges of EU membership. (Turkish Cypriots of genuine Cypriot extraction are able to apply for Republic of Cyprus passports.) This has started to change international attitudes towards the Turkish Cypriots as the Republic of Cyprus government still insists upon maintaining the international embargoes on the TRNC despite the results of the vote.

Executive branch

|President
|Ersin Tatar
|National Unity Party
|23 October 2020
|-
|Prime Minister
|Faiz Sucuoğlu
|National Unity Party
|5 November 2021
|}
The Council of Ministers is appointed by the Prime Minister and endorsed by the President.

Legislative branch
Northern Cyprus elects a legislature. The Assembly of the Republic (Cumhuriyet Meclisi) has 50 members, elected for a five-year term by mitigated proportional representation. A party must cross the election threshold (5% of the total vote) to get any seats in parliament. The parliament is composed of 50 MPs, chosen from 5 electoral districts, Lefkosa (Nicosia), Magusa (Famagusta), Girne (Kyrenia), Guzelyurt and Iskele. In parliamentary elections, voters vote for individual candidates. There are two ways of voting for this.
One can either vote for a party, which in effect means is voting for every candidate from that party in that electoral district once. Voter can further prioritize the MPs in this kind of voting.
Or alternatively one may not choose a party but would vote for different candidates from different parties. In this kind of mixed voting, a person can not choose more than the number of MPs from that district.

Political parties and elections

The presidential election takes place every 5 years. In the elections, in order to secure outright victory, a candidate has to have at least 50% of the votes. Otherwise the candidates that receive the two highest votes will go to second round voting one week later and the winner becomes the president.

Summary of the 2020 presidential election results:

Summary of the 2018 parliamentary election results:

Judicial branch
Magistrate Courts. They handle all minor criminal cases and minor civil cases, including small claims. Criminal courts can impose sentences of up to 5 years imprisonment

Traffic Courts. They handle all violations of traffic rules. The highest penalty they can impose are fines and community service.

Administrative District Courts They handle all administrative cases including tax, probate, immigration, and citizenship issues.

Family Courts. Handle all cases involving family law

Labor Courts. Handle all cases involving labor law.

Criminal District Courts. They handle all cases of first instance in major criminal cases, major civil cases, and juvenile.

Military District Courts. Handle all criminal, civil, and administrative cases involving military personnels.

Supreme Court. Is the only and last court of appeals in all cases for all courts. Judges are appointed by the High Judicial Council (made up of eight High Court judges,  the President of the Republic, representatives from the Republic's Assembly, the Bar, and the Prosecutor General).

Source: BRTK

Other issues
Political pressure groups and leaders:
Federation of Turkish Cypriot Labor Unions (or Turk-Sen)

International organization participation:
 Organisation of Islamic Cooperation (OIC) (observer-state member),  Economic Cooperation Organization (ECO) (observer-state member)

References

See also 

 UK Foreign and Commonwealth Office -Cyprus  
 Foreign relations of Northern Cyprus
 Northern Cyprus citizenship

 

bg:Държавно устройство на Кипър